Zhecheng County is a county under the administration of the prefecture-level city of Shangqiu, in the east of Henan province, People's Republic of China, with the population of about 1 million.

Administrative divisions
As 2012, this county is divided to 7 towns and 14 townships.
Towns

Townships

Climate

References

County-level divisions of Henan
Shangqiu